Irving Francis Wood (1861–1934) was an American biblical scholar.

Professor Wood was born at Walton, New York.  He graduated from Hamilton College in 1885 with a Bachelor of Arts degree, and taught at Jaffna College, Ceylon, until 1889. Wood then studied for his Bachelor of Divinity degree at Yale and completed it in 1892, the same year he met and married his wife, Katherine Hastings. Katherine bore him two children, Constance and Edna, who both went to get collegiate degrees. He taught for a short time at the University of Chicago before taking a job as a professor of Biblical literature and comparative religion at Smith College in 1893. He went continuously studied and received a Ph. D. from the University of Chicago in 1903 and a D.D. from Hamilton College in 1915. He requisitioned a leave of absence from Smith College for year's time (1934-25) to serve as a visiting professor in Ginling College, Nanjing, China. Wood had served on Ginling's Board of Founders for an extensive period of time. During this period he also taught at Doshisa University in Japan. He retired from Smith College in 1930 and took trips back to China to guest lecture at Ginling and visit his daughter, who was a missionary. He died in Washington, D.C., in 1934.

Professor Wood was the author of The Spirit of God in Biblical Literature-A Study in the History of Religion (1904) and Adult Class Study (1911).  He was coauthor with Elihu Grant of The bible as Literature (1914), and with Newton M. Hall of the following:  The Bible Story (five volumes, 1906); Adult Bible Classes (1906); The Early Days Of Israel (In 3 Parts, Copyright 1906, The Pilgrim Press); and The Days of the Kings of Israel (1908).

Sources
Wood's biographical entry in The American Context of Christian Colleges and Schools index

External links
 
 

American theologians
1861 births
1934 deaths
Hamilton College (New York) alumni
University of Chicago alumni
Yale Divinity School alumni
Smith College faculty
Presidents of the American Academy of Religion
People from Walton, New York